Nasir Khan Shahsevan was the second khan of the Ardabil Khanate from 1792 to . He was the son of Nazarali Khan of Ardabil and was sometime married to a daughter of Ibrahim Khalil Khan. However, other sources mention his brother Farajulla Khan in that regard.

Succession 
After his death, Shahsevan tribes were divided, his brother Farajulla inherited Ardabil proper, while his nieces (sons of his brother Kuchek Khan) Ata Khan Shahsevan (1796-1828) and Shukrullah Khan Shahsevan (1789-1808) took control of Meshgin and Moghan respectively, another niece Khodaverdi Khan settling in near western border of Talysh Khanate. Latter two became vassals of Farajulla, while Farajulla himself appears to have ruled together with Nasir Khan's son, Nazarali Khan II.

However, other sources doubt even existence of Nasir Khan, such as Gustav Radde and Vladimir Markov. Radde doesn't even mention Nasir Khan, makes Nazarali and Badr Khans brothers. According to Markov, Nazarali and Kuchek Khans were sons of Badr Khan, again, not mentioning Nasir. His death year is not established.

References

Sources 
 
 

People from Ardabil
Ardabil Khanate